Israil Gurung  is an Indian professional footballer who last played as a forward for I-League side Churchill Brothers.

Career
Gurung joined up with Portuguese 2nd division side Vitória de Guimarães B on loan from his Indian Super League team FC Pune City during the 2015 winter Transfer window; joining the Portuguese side until the end of the 2014–15 season.

In 2018 he signed for Churchill Brothers, where he scored a goal in a 2–0 victory against Indian Arrows.

See also
 List of Indian football players in foreign leagues

References 

Living people
1989 births
People from Alipurduar district
Footballers from West Bengal
Indian Gorkhas
Indian footballers
Association football wingers
Churchill Brothers FC Goa players
Mohammedan SC (Kolkata) players
DSK Shivajians FC players
I-League players
Indian expatriate footballers
Hindustan FC players
Sporting Clube de Goa players
SESA Football Academy players
Indian Super League players
Vitória S.C. B players
Expatriate footballers in Portugal
Mohun Bagan AC players
Gurung people